Several tropical nations have participated in the Winter Olympics despite not having the climate for winter sports. Partly because of that, their entries are a subject of human interest stories during the Games. No tropical nation has ever won a Winter Olympic medal. 

The first warm-weather, but not tropical, nation participating in the Winter Olympics was Mexico. Much of Mexico is at a latitude north of the Tropic of Cancer, and most of the country has a subtropical highland or semi-arid climate, so it is not exclusively a tropical nation.  Nonetheless, Mexico made its Winter Olympic debut at the 1928 Winter Olympics with a five-man bobsleigh team that finished eleventh of twenty-three entrants. Mexico did not return again to the Winter Games until the 1984 Winter Olympics.

The first truly tropical nation to compete in the Winter Olympic Games is the Philippines, who sent two alpine skiers to the 1972 Winter Olympics in Sapporo, Japan. Ben Nanasca placed 42nd in giant slalom skiing (out of 73 entrants), and Juan Cipriano did not finish.  In slalom skiing, neither skier was able to finish. Costa Rica became the second tropical nation to participate at the Winter Games, in the 1980 Winter Olympics at Lake Placid, New York, where Arturo Kinch also competed in alpine skiing events.  Kinch would continue to compete for Costa Rica at three more Winter Games, including the 2006 Winter Olympics at age 49. There he finished 96th in the 15 km cross-country skiing event, ahead of only Prawat Nagvajara of Thailand, another tropical nation.

The 1988 Winter Olympics in Calgary, Alberta, Canada attracted many tropical nations, including Costa Rica, Fiji, Guam, Guatemala, Jamaica, Netherlands Antilles, the Philippines, Puerto Rico, and the United States Virgin Islands. The Jamaica bobsleigh team became a fan favorite at these Games and were later the inspiration of the 1993 motion picture Cool Runnings. In the 1994 Winter Olympics six years later, the Jamaican four-man sled placed a creditable fourteenth, ahead of the United States and Russia, while Jamaican-born bobsledder Lascelles Brown won silver for Canada in 2006.

The 2006 Winter Olympics in Turin, Italy marked the Winter Games debut of Ethiopia and Madagascar. The 2010 Winter Olympics in Vancouver, British Columbia, Canada saw the debut of the Cayman Islands, Colombia, Peru, and Ghana. The 2014 Winter Olympics saw the debut of Dominica, Paraguay, Timor-Leste, Togo, Tonga, and Zimbabwe. The 2018 Winter Olympics saw the debut of Ecuador, Eritrea, Malaysia, Nigeria, and Singapore. The 2022 Winter Olympics saw the debut of Haiti.

List of participating tropical nations

This list of nations includes those that lie entirely or predominantly within the tropical latitudes and also have a mostly tropical climate according to the Köppen climate classification system.  Years of Winter Olympic Games participation are shown.

Other warm-weather nations (located in the subtropics, for example) that have competed in the Winter Games include Australia (which has a tropical far north, and became the first Southern Hemisphere nation to win a gold medal at the Winter Olympics in 2002), Bermuda, Chinese Taipei, Eswatini, Hong Kong, India, Mexico, South Africa, Uruguay and several North African nations including Algeria, Egypt and Morocco.

Tonga sought to make its Winter Olympic debut at the 2010 Winter Olympics by entering a single competitor in luge, attracting some media attention, but he crashed in the final round of qualifying. Two years later, he attracted media attention again when it was discovered he had altered his name to that of one of his sponsors, a lingerie firm, as a marketing stunt. He was, at that time, in training to attempt to qualify for the 2014 Winter Olympics.

Notable winter Olympians from tropical nations

Winter Paralympic Games
As of 2022, only three tropical nations have been represented at the Winter Paralympic Games. Tofiri Kibuuka of Uganda competed in cross-country skiing at the inaugural edition of the Winter Paralympics in 1976 and again at the 1980 Games. After Kibuuka obtained Norwegian nationality, he began to compete for Norway at the Paralympics starting in 1984, winning several medals in athletics at the Summer Paralympics. Brazil sent two athletes as part of its debut at the 2014 Winter Paralympics. Puerto Rico sent one athlete as part of its debut at the 2022 Winter Paralympics.

Winter Youth Olympic Games
Five tropical nations were represented at the First Winter Youth Olympics in Innsbruck, Austria.

See also
 List of participating nations at the Winter Olympic Games

Notes

References

Nations at the Winter Olympics
Winter Olympics
Winter Olympics
Olympics
Winter Olympics
Olympics
Olympics